Saint Humility (Humilitas) (c. 1226 – 22 May 1310) was a founder of Vallumbrosan convents, and is considered the founder of the Vallumbrosan Nuns.

Biography
Born Rosanna Negusanti to a noble family from Faenza, she was married at the age of fifteen to a nobleman named Ugoletto (Ugonotto) dei Caccianemici (d. 1256). She bore two children, both of whom died in infancy. In 1250, Ugoletto became a monk upon recovering from an illness that nearly killed him.  Rosanna entered the same double monastery of canonesses named Saint Perpetua, near Faenza, becoming a nun and taking the name Humilitas.

She became an anchoress in a cell attached to the Vallumbrosan church of Saint Apollinaris in Faenza, where she lived as a hermit or recluse for twelve years.

However, at the request of the abbot-general she founded a Vallumbrosan monastery (which became called Santa Maria Novella alla Malta) outside Faenza and became its abbess. Blessed Margherita became one of her disciples.

In 1282, she founded a second convent at Florence, dedicated to Saint John the Evangelist, where she died in 1310 of natural causes. She left a number of mystical writings. She is most known for composing and preaching nine Latin sermons, and for writing Lauds to the Virgin Mary in verse.

She was canonized on 27 January 1720 by Pope Clement XI.

Her feast day is celebrated on 22 May.

The relics of Humility and her disciple Margherita are venerated at the convent of Spirito Santo at  near Florence.

See also

 List of Catholic saints

References

External links
Catholic Online
Catholic Forum: Saints
 Santi e beati: Santa Umiltà

1226 births
1310 deaths
Medieval Italian saints
13th-century Italian Roman Catholic religious sisters and nuns
Founders of Catholic religious communities
People from the Province of Ravenna
13th-century Christian saints
14th-century Christian saints
Female saints of medieval Italy
14th-century Italian Roman Catholic religious sisters and nuns
Canonizations by Pope Clement XI